Kudaria, also spelled Kudariya, is a village in Barhara block of Bhojpur district in Bihar, India. As of 2011, its population was 1,012, in 160 households.

References 

Villages in Bhojpur district, India